Isaac Stockton Keith Ogier (July 27, 1819 – May 21, 1861) was a United States district judge of the United States District Court for the Southern District of California.

Education and career
Born in Charleston, South Carolina, Ogier read law to enter the bar in 1845. He was in private practice briefly in Charleston, and then in New Orleans, Louisiana from 1845 to 1846.

He served in Company H, 4th Louisiana Militia Infantry Regiment, known as the Montezuma Regiment, from 1846 to 1848 and became a captain.

He then returned to private practice in New Orleans from 1848 to 1849. He moved his practice to San Joaquin, California from 1849 to 1850, and was at the same time a member of the California House of Representatives. He then relocated to Los Angeles, California, practicing there from 1850 to 1852, and serving as district attorney for Los Angeles County, California from 1851 to 1852. He was the United States Attorney for the Southern District of California from 1853 to 1854.

Federal judicial service

On January 18, 1854, Ogier was nominated by President Franklin Pierce to a new seat on the United States District Court for the Southern District of California created by 10 Stat. 265. He was confirmed by the United States Senate on January 23, 1854, and received his commission the same day. Ogier served in that capacity until his death on May 21, 1861, in San Bernardino County, California.

References

Sources
 

1819 births
1861 deaths
Lawyers from Charleston, South Carolina
Military personnel from Charleston, South Carolina
Lawyers from San Francisco
Members of the California State Assembly
Judges of the United States District Court for the Southern District of California
United States federal judges appointed by Franklin Pierce
19th-century American judges
American militia officers
19th-century American politicians
United States federal judges admitted to the practice of law by reading law